Amir Nosrat'ollah Balakhanlou (1917 – May 20, 2007) was an Iranian (Persian) politician. Born in Tehran, he served as a two-time Mayor and MP for Hamedan in 1950s and early 1960s.

Biography
Amir Nosrat'ollah Balakhanlou was born in Tehran, Iran. He was one of the two sons of Commander Asad Khan of Talesh. His maternal grandfather, Mirza Mahmud Ehtesham ol-Saltaneh, was the Iranian ambassador to Russia, and was the President of the Majlis in the early 1900s. Ehtesham ol-Saltaneh was also one of the founding fathers of the Iranian Constitution during the Qajar dynasty.

As a young man, Amir N. Balakhanlou completed his higher education and his military service in the Royal Air Force Academy of Iran. In the mid-1950s, he served as the first publicly elected mayor of Hamedan. He continued to serve a second term as the mayor, and in the early 1960s, became the MP from Hamedan in Iran's twenty-first (21st) round of Parliament (Majlis of Iran).

References

External links
Funeral Coverage on Hegmataneh Newspaper
IRNA Article
Hamedan News
FarsNews

1917 births
2007 deaths
Mayors of places in Iran
Deputies of Hamadan for National Consultative Assembly
Politicians from Tehran
20th-century Iranian politicians